Teliamura is a town and a Municipal Council in Khowai district in the Indian state of Tripura. It is on National Highway No. 08 of India. It is also the headquarters of the recently included sub-division of Teliamura. It is 45 km from Agartala, Capital of Tripura, 35 km from Khowai and 42 km from Ambassa.

Geography

Forest
In the Sub-Division of Teliamura there is a total of 49573 hectors of forest land in which the Kalyanpur range sector constitutes 17744 hector, whereas Teliamura range sector constitutes 6168 hector and 25661 hector in Mungiakami range sector.

Demographics
 India census GOI Teliamura has a population of 19,605. Males constitute 51% of the population and females 49%. Teliamura has an average literacy rate of 81%, higher than the national average of 59.5%: male literacy is 85%, and female literacy is 78%. In Teliamura, 10% of the population is under 6 years of age.

Politics
Teliamura assembly constituency is part of Tripura East (Lok Sabha constituency).

Education
One Inspectorate in the Sub-Division under which 15 H.S. Schools, 25 High Schools, 48 Sr. Basic Schools, 94 Junior Basic schools (Non-ADC - 36, ADC- 58) operate in Teliamura.
Schools
 Saradamayee Vidyapith High School (English Medium)
 Kabi Nazrul Bidya Bhabhan
 Teliamura H.S. School 
 Vivekanada High School
 
 Ananda Marga High School (English medium), with pre-primary section  
 Netajinagar High School
 Bloom Adventist  school
 NICs Teliamura, Khowai Tripura

 Kalyanpur H.S. School
Assam rifles high school

Transport

Train

It is well connected by Railways.   is situated at Trishabari,  from Teliamura main Town. Regular auto service available from and to various part of Teliamura.

Road
Teliamura is connected with Assam through National Highway 8. It is also connected to Khowai, Amarpur by Road.

See also
 List of cities and towns in Tripura

References

External links
 Government of Tripura
 West Tripura District

Cities and towns in Khowai district